In enzymology, an acyl-lysine deacylase is an enzyme that catalyzes the chemical reaction

N6-acyl-L-lysine + H2O  a carboxylate + L-lysine

Thus, the two substrates of this enzyme are N6-acyl-L-lysine and H2O, whereas its two products are carboxylate and L-lysine.

This enzyme belongs to the family of hydrolases, those acting on carbon-nitrogen bonds other than peptide bonds, specifically in linear amides.  The systematic name of this enzyme class is N6-acyl-L-lysine amidohydrolase. Other names in common use include epsilon-lysine acylase, and 6-N-acyl-L-lysine amidohydrolase.  This enzyme participates in lysine degradation.

References

 

EC 3.5.1
Enzymes of unknown structure